Energy Recovery Inc. (NASDAQ: ERII)  manufactures energy recovery devices for fluid-flow industries globally, most notably Sea Water Reverse Osmosis (SWRO). Different applications of the company’s core technologies harness untapped fluid energy or facilitate the transfer of energy between two different fluids, reducing overall operating costs and carbon emissions in a variety of industrial applications such as desalination, wastewater treatment, and CO2 refrigeration. Energy Recovery produces its equipment in a facility located at the company’s headquarters.

Energy Recovery is based in San Leandro, California, with international offices in Dubai, United Arab Emirates; and Shanghai, China; and Madrid, Spain.

History
Energy Recovery was founded in 1992 by Leif and Marissa Hauge and incorporated in Virginia. The company was reincorporated in Delaware in 2001. Energy Recovery began selling products in 1997 and went public in 2008.

On October 19, 2015, Energy Recovery signed a 15-year licensing agreement with Schlumberger Technology Corporation granting Schlumberger the exclusive rights to utilize Energy Recovery’s VorTeq technology in on-shore oil and gas well completions globally.

In 2016, Forbes reported that Energy Recovery was the top performing company in California in terms of annual returns on investment, with a return of 317.3%.

The company is currently led by president and chief executive officer Robert Mao who was appointed in May 2020.

Products

PX Pressure Exchanger 
The PX Pressure Exchanger device is Energy Recovery’s flagship product used in desalination.  The Pressure Exchanger's technology utilizes pressure energy that can reduce electricity and maintenance costs. The device collides two fluid flows, transferring the energy from one fluid to the next. This energy transfer occurs in less than a fraction of a second, reducing the interaction between the two fluids.

Energy Recovery holds a majority market share in the desalination industry. There are 16,000 Pressure Exchangers in operation worldwide. The global desalination market has an annual recurring total addressable market (TAM) of US$50 million. The company’s technologies have cut more than 14 billion kWh of energy each year and produced more than 12 billion liters of clean water daily.

VorTeq 
VorTeq adapts Energy Recovery’s Pressure Exchanger technology to protect pumps used in the hydraulic fracturing process from fluid damage, improving efficiencies by cutting costs and production time during fracturing jobs. The VorTeq hydraulic pumping system was unveiled at Energy Recovery’s December 2014 analyst and investor event in New York City. That same year, Energy Recovery filed 43 patents to develop VorTeq’s technology for use in hydraulic fracturing.

On October 19, 2015, Energy Recovery announced a 15-year licensing agreement with Schlumberger Technology Corporation, granting Schlumberger the exclusive rights to utilize Energy Recovery’s VorTeq technology in onshore oil and gas well completions globally.

A major pain point in hydraulic fracturing is pump failure caused by the sand or proppant-filled fluid.  Every year, approximately US$4.1 million is spent by frac crews performing maintenance on pumps, resulting in an average 40 percent redundancy in equipment on site. The proppant-filled fluid passes through VorTeq so that high pressure pumps aren’t damaged. This allows the pump fleet to pump only clean water.  VorTeq’s technology can potentially save companies up to US$1 million per fleet in maintenance costs, and save the hydraulic fracturing industry approximately US$1.4 billion per year.

The device is designed to handle up to 110 barrels per minute with a treating pressure of up to 15,000 psi and the core is made of tungsten carbide, which is 1,000 times more resistant to abrasion than steel.

Liberty Oilfield Services will be the first company to test VorTeq in 2015 and will conduct the first live well field trials.

According to Neal Hagerman, engineering manager at Integrated Petroleum Technologies, “Incorporating the VorTeq system could represent a paradigm shift in how the service company industry approaches preventative maintenance, because hydraulic horsepower pumps will no longer be exposed to the abrasive slurry mixture of proppant and water, the source of most maintenance issues. Eliminating these issues will reduce backup requirements and improve overall operational efficiency.”

IsoBoost

Energy Recovery’s IsoBoost system reduces the wear on pumps used in gas processing and ammonia production, reducing maintenance costs and increasing plant runtime.

The IsoBoost system is the highest efficiency energy recovery system on the market for amine processing.  IsoBoost’s technology is designed to harness energy from pressure drops in one liquid process flow to boost the pressure in an adjacent flow.  At the heart of the IsoBoost system is a hydraulic turbocharger, which is customized for each application to yield optimal operational flexibility at high efficiencies.

The IsoBoost system employs a liquid phase turbocharger with maximum flexibility. The device recovers energy in acid gas treatment processes at up to 80 percent efficiency, increasing productivity and profitability and reducing the carbon footprint created during the processes.

Energy Transfer partners’ Jackalope plant in Hebronville, Texas, installed IsoBoost in 2008, and the plant’s total maintenance costs have fallen by 67 percent.

IsoGen

Energy Recovery’s IsoGen system generates electricity by taking the energy in the fluid and converting it into usable electrical power.

The IsoGen turbine, with an electrical generator, captures the pressure energy released by pipelines when fluids flow downhill. When oil or gas travels downhill in a pipeline, it builds pressure, and pipelines use choke valves to release that excess pressure. The energy that is released through this pressure letdown is usually wasted.[12] Through the IsoGen, this energy can be captured and used at the pumping station or transferred into the power grid.

In 2015, Saudi Aramco commissioned an IsoGen system for a gas processing plant in the Middle East.

References

External links
 Official Energy Recovery Inc. website

Energy companies of the United States
Technology companies based in the San Francisco Bay Area
Companies based in San Leandro, California
Energy companies established in 1992
Non-renewable resource companies established in 1992
1992 establishments in California
Companies listed on the Nasdaq